Palawa is a census village in Mumdawar tehsil of the Alwar district in the Indian state of Rajasthan.   It is located 64 km from Alwar and 149 km from the State capital of Jaipur

Its Palawa Pin code is 301706 and postal head office is Shahjahanpur.

Demographics of Palawa 
Palawa is surrounded by Kishangarh Bas Tehsil towards the east, Nimrana Tehsil towards the west, Bawal Tehsil and Kotkasim Tehsil towards the North.

Bawal, Alwar, Rewari, Narnaul are the nearby Cities to Palawa. It is on the border of the Alwar District and the Rewari District.

Rajasthani is the Local Language here.

Time zone: IST (UTC+5:30) 
Elevation / Altitude: 284 meters. Above Sea level 
Telephone Code / Std Code: 01495

Schools in Palawa 
Govt. Ups(snskrit) Palawa
Jupiter Ups Pubsch Palawa
Shri Krisan Pub. Sch. Palawa
Govt. Prvesika. Ss Palawa
Govt. Ss Palawa

References 

Villages in Alwar district